Antanas Zapolskis (born 20 April 1962) is a Lithuanian chess player who holds the titles of International Master (IM, 1992). He is two times winner of Lithuanian Chess Championship (1995, 1999).

Biography 
Antanas Zapolskis was a multiple participant of the Lithuanian Chess Championships, in which he won two gold medals (1995, 1999).

In 1995 in Riga he participated in World Chess Championship Baltic Zonal tournament.

In 1997 Antanas Zapolskis was winner of the Open Chess Tournament Heart of Finland (shared 1st-3rd places with Mikhail Rychagov and Aleksander Veingold). In 2005 he won International Chess Tournament Arcimpex Cup in Frýdek-Místek.

Antanas Zapolskis played for Lithuania in the European Team Chess Championships:
 In 1999, at second board in the 12th European Team Chess Championship in Batumi (+4, =1, -4),
 In 2003, at fourth board in the 14th European Team Chess Championship in Plovdiv (+1, =1, -6).

Antanas Zapolskis also two times played for Lithaunian chess clubs in European Chess Club Cups (1996, 2008).

In 1992 he was awarded the FIDE International Master (IM) title.

References

External links 

1962 births
Living people
Chess International Masters
Lithuanian chess players
Sportspeople from Vilnius